Sue Middleton (born 1947) is a retired New Zealand academic who spent her career at the University of Waikato focused on life histories.

Career
After a 1979 MSc thesis, A phenomenological perspective for the classroom teacher and its application to the education of women at Victoria University of Wellington and a 1985 PhD dissertation Feminism and education in post-war New Zealand: a sociological analysis  at University of Waikato, New Zealand, Middleton joined the faculty.

From 2000 to 2006 Middleton was director of the Centre for Research in Social Policy.

In 2013, Middleton was awarded Emeritus Professor by the University of Waikato. Middleton is credited for pioneering New Zealand's first studies centred around "women and education [sic] and education and sexuality."

In 2019, Middleton and Helen May co-edited For Women and Children: a tribute to Geraldine McDonald, a collection of writings in honour of the life and work of researcher Geraldine McDonald.

Selected works 

 Middleton, Sue. Educating feminists: Life histories and pedagogy. Teachers College Press, 1234 Amsterdam Avenue, New York, NY 10027., 1993.
 Middleton, Sue. "Disciplining sexuality: Foucault, life histories, and education." (1998).
 Weiler, Kathleen, and Sue Middleton. "Telling women's lives: Narrative inquiries in the history of women's education." British Journal of Educational Studies 47, no. 3 (1999).
 Middleton, Sue. "Developing a radical pedagogy: Autobiography of a New Zealand sociologist of women’s education." In Studying teachers' lives, pp. 30-62. Routledge, 2013.
 Middleton, Sue. Henri Lefebvre and education: Space, history, theory. Routledge, 2013.
 Middleton, Sue, and Helen May. "Teachers Talk Teaching, 1915-1995 Early Childhood, Schools and Teachers' Colleges." (1997).
 Middleton, Sue, and Alison Jones, eds. Women and education in Aotearoa. Vol. 2. Auckland University Press, 1997.
 Middleton, Sue, John A. Codd, and Alison Jones, eds. New Zealand education policy today: Critical perspectives. Allen & Unwin, 1990.

Awards 
Emeritus Professor, Faculty of Education, University of Waikato, February 2013.
Two Visiting Fellowships, Dept of Education Foundations & Policy Studies, London Institute of Education: October–December 2009; November 2010.
NZARE McKenzie Award for Educational Research, (a lifetime achievement award), New Zealand Association for Research in Education, 2003.
American Educational Studies Association Critics’ Choice Award for book: Middleton, S. (1993) Educating feminists: Life-histories and pedagogy. New York: Teachers’ College Press, University of Columbia.
Fulbright-Hayes Travel Award (Senior Scholar) to visit US universities and to do research on 'the sociology of women's education', 1991.

References

External links
  
 Sue Middleton on Researchgate

Living people
New Zealand educational theorists
Academic staff of the University of Waikato
New Zealand sociologists
1947 births
New Zealand feminists
Victoria University of Wellington alumni
University of Waikato alumni